Chandmani (jewel, also Chandman) is a sum (district) of the Govi-Altai Province in western Mongolia. In 2009, its population was 2,053.

References 

Populated places in Mongolia
Districts of Govi-Altai Province